St. Agnes Church may refer to:

Canada
 St. Agnes Church, Thunder Bay, Ontario

Germany
St. Agnes, Cologne, Germany

Italy
Sant'Agnese fuori le mura, Rome, Italy
Sant'Agnese in Agone, Rome, Italy

Japan
St. Agnes Cathedral (Kyoto), Japan

United Kingdom
St Agnes' Church, Freshwater, Isle of Wight, England
Church of St Agnes and St Pancras, Toxteth Park, Liverpool, England
St Anne and St Agnes, City of London, England
St Agnes' Church, Burmantofts, Leeds, England
St Agnes' Church, St Agnes, Isles of Scilly, UK

United States
(by state)
Several in the U.S. are listed on the National Register of Historic Places (NRHP)
St. Agnes Catholic Church (Mena, Arkansas), NRHP-listed
St. Agnes Church (Greenwich, Connecticut)
Julia A. Purnell Museum, formerly St. Agnes Catholic Church, Snow Hill, Maryland
St. Agnes Catholic Church (Detroit, Michigan)
Church of St. Agnes (Saint Paul, Minnesota), NRHP-listed
St. Agnes Church (New York City)
Saint Agnes Episcopal Church, Franklin, North Carolina
St. Agnes Catholic Church (Vermillion, South Dakota), NRHP-listed
St. Agnes Church (Utica, South Dakota), NRHP-listed
Church of the Ascension and St Agnes (Washington D.C.)
St. Agnes Church (Green Bay, Wisconsin)

See also
Saint Agnes (disambiguation)
St. Agnes Cathedral (disambiguation)